Edward Beryl Cray (July 3, 1933 – October 8, 2019) was an American journalist, biographer and educator. Cray was best known for his biographies of Woody Guthrie and Earl Warren.

Bibliography

References

1933 births
2019 deaths
20th-century American journalists
American male journalists
21st-century American journalists
American biographers